Dystis was a city and bishopric in Roman Libya, which remains a Latin Catholic titular see.

Its modern location has been postulated in northern Tunisia or somewhere in southern modern Libya.

History 
Dystis was important enough in the Roman province of Libya Superior -Libya Pentapolitana; originally part of Cyrenaica (and Crete)- to become one of the suffragan sees in this province, which depend directly on the Patriarchate of Alexandria (in Egypt) without a proper Metropolitan, but faded like most bishoprics in Roman Africa.

Its only recorded Suffragan Bishops were:

 Samuel, participant in the (minor) council of Ephesus in 431
 Petrus, attending the Synod of Constantinople (458) |synod of Constantinople in 458 against simony.

Titular see 
In 1933 the diocese was nominally restored as Latin Titular bishopric of Dystis / Dystien(sis) (Latin adjective) / Disti (Curiate Italian).

It is vacant, having had only these incumbents, all of the fitting Episcopal (lowest) rank, with an archiepiscopal exception (pro hac vice):
 André-Joseph-Prosper Dupont, White Fathers (M. Afr.) (1941.07.08 – 1955.09.14) as  last Apostolic Vicar of Bobo-Dioulasso (Burkina Faso, then Upper Volta) (1941.07.08 – 1955.09.14), next promoted first Bishop of Roman Catholic Diocese of Bobo-Dioulasso (1955.09.14 – retired 1974.12.12); died 1999
 Antonio Oña de Echave (1956.03.27 – 1961.05.24) as Auxiliary Bishop of Lugo (Spain) (1956.03.27 – 1961.05.24), next succeeded as Bishop of Lugo (1961.05.24 – retired 1979.07.25); died 1987
Titular Archbishop Emilio de Brigard Ortiz (1961.10.26 – death 1986.03.06) as Auxiliary Bishop of Archdiocese of Bogotá (Colombia) (1944.07.29 – 1986.03.06), which he was previously as Titular Bishop of Coracesium (1944.07.29 – 1961.10.26).

See also 
 List of Catholic dioceses in Libya

Sources and external links 
 GCatholic - data for all sections
 Bibliography
 Pius Bonifacius Gams, Series episcoporum Ecclesiae Catholicae, Leipzig, 1931, p. 462
 Michel Lequien, Oriens christianus in quatuor Patriarchatus digestus, Paris, 1740, Vol. II, coll. 629-630
 Raymond Janin, lemma 'Dysthis' in Dictionnaire d'Histoire et de Géographie ecclésiastiques, vol. XIV, Paris, 1960, col. 1252

References

Catholic titular sees in Africa
Former Roman Catholic dioceses in Africa
Archaeological sites in Libya
Roman sites in Libya
Former populated places in Libya
Ancient Cyrenaica
Populated places of the Byzantine Empire
Suppressed Roman Catholic dioceses